Martin Novák (born November 2, 1988) is a Czech professional ice hockey player. He is currently playing for LHK Jestřábi Prostějov of the Czech 1.liga.

Novák made his Czech Extraliga debut playing with HC Slovan Bratislava during the 2007-08 Czech Extraliga season.

References

External links

1988 births
Living people
HC Most players
HC Sparta Praha players
HC Slovan Bratislava players
HC Slovan Ústečtí Lvi players
HC Stadion Litoměřice players
LHK Jestřábi Prostějov players
Motor České Budějovice players
Czech ice hockey forwards